Aristaenetus may refer to:
 Aristaenetus, 5th/6th century epistolographer
 Aristaenetus (consul), Roman consul in 404
 Aristaenetus, an Achaean general who commanded the cavalry on the right wing in the Battle of Mantineia in 207 BCE